The 2016 Ankara bombing may refer to:

February 2016 Ankara bombing
March 2016 Ankara bombing